Time Machine is the fifth studio album by guitarist Joe Satriani, released on October 26, 1993 through Relativity Records and reissued in 1998 through Epic Records. It is a double-disc album: the first disc contains a selection of new tracks, outtakes and unreleased studio recordings, while the second disc is composed of live recordings from 1988 and 1992.

The album reached No. 95 on the U.S. Billboard 200 and remained on that chart for eight weeks, as well as reaching No. 72 in the Netherlands and No. 87 in Germany. "All Alone" was released as a single, reaching No. 21 on Billboard'''s Mainstream Rock chart and receiving a nomination for Best Rock Instrumental Performance at the 1995 Grammy Awards, along with "Speed of Light" at the 1994 Grammys, Satriani's fifth and sixth such nominations. Time Machine was certified Gold on October 27, 1994.

Overview
The album's 1998 reissue contains detailed liner notes explaining the story behind the content of both discs. Five tracks were originally recorded during the sessions for The Extremist (1992): "Crazy", "Banana Mango II", "Thinking of You", "Speed of Light" (featured on the soundtrack to the 1993 film Super Mario Bros.) and "Baroque". Four other tracks were previously released on Satriani's 1984 self-titled EP: "Banana Mango", "Dreaming #11", "I Am Become Death" and "Saying Goodbye". A fifth track from the EP, "Talk to Me", was not included due to its master tape being damaged.

Recording locations

Disc one
The first disc was recorded in the following locations between 1984 and 1993:
 The Barn - Bearsville, NY in 1990.
 Hyde Street - San Francisco, CA between 1986-87.
 The Plant - Sausalito, CA between 1991-93. This is where the live tracks on the second disc were mixed.
 Record One - Sherman Oaks, CA between 1991-93. 
 Ocean Way - Los Angeles, CA between 1991-93. 
 Alpha and Omega Recordings - San Francisco, CA between 1986–87 and 1990-1991. 
 Fantasy Studios - Berkeley, CA between 1990-1993. 
 Coast Recorders - San Francisco, CA between 1990-91.
 The Site - Marin County, CA in May 1993.

Most of the above locations were also used to record and mix his 1992 album, The Extremist.

Disc two
The second disc uses live recordings from three shows on the Extremist Tour and one show on the Surfing with the Alien tour. 
The recordings taken from the Extremist Tour are from the following shows:
 Tower Theatre, Philadelphia, USA - December 3, 1992
 Orpheum Theatre, Boston, USA - December 23, 1992
 Hammersmith Apollo, London, UK - February 5, 1993

The recording taken from the Surfing with the Alien tour is from the following show: 
 California Theatre, San Diego, USA - June 11, 1988 
This show originally aired on the King Biscuit Flower Hour radio show on July 31, 1988. Three songs (Ice 9, Memories and Hordes of Locusts) were also used on the Dreaming No. 11 EP.

According to a 2014 interview with Joe for MusicRadar.com, the Roseland Ballroom show in New York (December 5, 1992) was also recorded for this album but wasn't used.
 
The Hammersmith Apollo show was recorded for and broadcast by BBC Radio 1 on May 1, 1993 and repeated on October 23, 1993 (both times at 19:30). It was produced by Jeff Griffin and recorded by Mike Robinson.

Critical reception

Phil Carter at AllMusic gave Time Machine'' 4.5 stars out of five, calling it "an excellent double-CD set providing something for just about everyone who's interested in Joe Satriani's music" and that "this set of recordings makes an excellent starting point for new fans and will give longtime fans something new as well."

Track listing

Disc one

Disc two

Personnel

Joe Satriani – vocals (track 6, 12), guitar, keyboard (tracks 1, 2, 4-6), bass (tracks 4, 6, 7, 9), harmonica,  arrangement (track 3), production
Phil Ashley – keyboard (tracks 6, 7, 14, live disc 1-10), sequencer (track 4)
Tom Coster – organ (track 3)
Jonathan Mover – drums (tracks 1-3, live disc 11-14) , percussion (tracks 1, 2)
Jeff Campitelli – drums (tracks 4, 6, 9), percussion (track 5), cymbals (track 5), hi-hat (track 5), drum programming (track 7)
Simon Phillips – drums (track 4, 14)
Gregg Bissonette – drums (live disc tracks 1-5, 7-10), bass drum (track 5)
Stuart Hamm – bass (tracks 1-3, live disc 11, 13-14)
Matt Bissonette – bass (track 5, live disc 1-5, 7-10)
Doug Wimbish – bass (track 14)
Bongo Bob Smith – drum programming (track 7)
John Cuniberti – engineering, production, drum programming (track 7)
Kooster McAllister – engineering
Neil King – engineering assistance
Bart Stevens – engineering assistance
Michael Semanick – engineering assistance
Dave Plank – engineering assistance
Dan Bosworth – engineering assistance
Kevin Scott – engineering assistance
Michael Reiter – engineering assistance
Bob Ludwig – mastering
Andy Johns – production

Charts

Awards

Certifications

References

External links
Time Machine at satriani.com
In Review: Joe Satriani "Time Machine" at Guitar Nine Records

Joe Satriani albums
Joe Satriani live albums
1993 albums
1993 live albums
Relativity Records albums
Albums produced by Andy Johns
Grammy Award for Best Rock Instrumental Performance